Adikoesoemo is a surname. Notable people with the surname include:

 Haryanto Adikoesoemo (born 1962), Indonesian businessman and art collector, son of Soegiarto
 Soegiarto Adikoesoemo (born 1938/39), Indonesian billionaire businessman